Brent Kinsman and Shane Kinsman (born November 13, 1997) are American twin child actors who typically portray rambunctious twins, most notably, as Kyle and Nigel Baker in the 2003 film Cheaper by the Dozen and its 2005 sequel Cheaper by the Dozen 2. They also had featured roles as Porter and Preston Scavo on the popular ABC television series Desperate Housewives for four years (replaced by Charlie Carver and Max Carver from season 5).

Filmography

Awards

References

External links

Get Desperate! - Shane Kinsman People Guide entry & news listings

Male actors from Los Angeles
American male child actors
American male film actors
American male television actors
Identical twin male actors
Living people
1997 births
American twins
American male identical twin child actors